Belvoir was a rural district in Leicestershire, England from 1894 to 1935.

It was formed under the Local Government Act 1894 from the part of the Grantham Rural Sanitary District that was in Leicestershire.  It was a small district, named after the village of Belvoir and contained nine parishes:
 Barkestone
 Belvoir
 Bottesford
 Croxton Kerrial
 Harston
 Knipton
 Muston
 Plungar
 Redmile.

Under the County Review Orders of the 1930s it was merged with the Melton Rural District to form the Melton and Belvoir Rural District. The merger took effect in 1935.

References
http://www.visionofbritain.org.uk/unit_page.jsp?u_id=10136696

Districts of England created by the Local Government Act 1894
History of Leicestershire
Rural districts of England